South Florida National Cemetery is a United States National Cemetery, located in western Lake Worth, Florida. It is maintained by the United States Department of Veterans Affairs, and it is also one of the newest national cemeteries in the United States, when it opened to the public on April 16, 2007, although the official dedication of the cemetery was on March 9, 2008. The federal approval for the  cemetery was in October 2000.

Notable burials
 Joe Astroth (1922–2013) Major League Baseball Player
 Johnny Gray (1926–2014) Major League Baseball Player
 John Orsino (1938–2016) Professional Baseball Player
 Claude R. Kirk Jr. (1926–2011) 36th Governor of Florida
 Hank Rosenstein (1920–2010) Professional Basketball Player
 Leo C. Zeferetti (1927–2018) US Congressman

References

External links

 
 

United States national cemeteries
Lake Worth Beach, Florida
Protected areas of Palm Beach County, Florida